Binza (Binja) is a Bantu language spoken in the Democratic Republic of the Congo.

References

Bangi-Ntomba languages